Innosight is a strategy consultancy within Huron Consulting Group, advising enterprises on business strategy. Innosight was founded in 2000 by Harvard Business School professor Clayton M. Christensen and senior partner Mark W. Johnson. Innosight uses methods based on the concept of disruptive innovation, a theory defined by Christensen in his book The Innovator's Dilemma. The company headquarters is located in Lexington, MA, with additional offices in Singapore and Switzerland. Scott D. Anthony is the firm's managing partner.

In 2018, the company launched a new online platform called Innosight X.

References

Consulting firms established in 2000
Innovation organizations
Companies based in Lexington, Massachusetts